Taro cake is a Cantonese dish made from the vegetable taro. While it is denser in texture than radish cakes, both of these savory cakes are made in similar ways, with rice flour as the main ingredient. As a dim sum, it is usually cut into rectangular slices and pan-fried before serving. It is found in Hong Kong, China, and overseas Chinatown restaurants. Other ingredients often include pork and Chinese black mushroom, or even Chinese sausages. It is usually topped with chopped scallions.

Variety

Regional home-style
The other version is the more home-style baked version. Usually it uses the same ingredients and steamed for long periods of time in a deep pan until it is ultra soft and pasty. The formula varies greatly depending on the family recipe or regional tastes.

Frozen taro cake
Some restaurants offer taro cakes cut into small cubes as part of a main course appetizer to a major Chinese cuisine.  These are sometimes frozen to a more solid state, though it is not nearly as common as the other forms.

In other cultures

A similar dish is prepared in the cuisine of Vietnam, where it is called bánh khoai môn.

In Malaysia and Singapore, it is known as yam cake.

See also

 Turnip cake
Water chestnut cake
Nian gao
Taro dumpling

References

Dim sum
Cantonese cuisine
Hong Kong cuisine
Chinese New Year foods
Steamed foods
Taro dishes